D-Sides is a 2007 compilation album by the British virtual band Gorillaz. The album contains B-sides and remixes from singles and bonus tracks for the band's second studio album Demon Days, as well as previously unreleased tracks recorded during the same sessions.  It was released on 19 November 2007 in the UK and on 20 November in the United States and is available in standard and deluxe editions. The Japanese deluxe edition includes three extra tracks, plus the video for 'Rockit'. D-Sides performed similarly to its 2002 predecessor, G-Sides, reaching No. 63 on the UK Albums Chart, while it reached No. 166 on the US Billboard 200 chart.

Background
In an interview with Verbicide Magazine, band members were asked if a new remix album would be produced for Demon Days as there was for Gorillaz. They answered that it was a possibility and that might involve the Spacemonkeyz again. In the same interview, they were asked if there might also be another G-Sides. Again, their answer was that it might be possible. In January 2007, websites began listing a March release date for a Phase 2 B-sides album. One of the websites, musictap.net, later pushed this back to 3 April. According to Gorillaz-Unofficial, the reaction of official parties behind Gorillaz is that the release date is just a rumour for now. On 29 August, musictap.net reported that the B-side album would be titled D-Sides and would be released on 20 November. On 18 September 2007, the official Gorillaz fan site confirmed the release of the album, as well as unveiling the album artwork and track listing. D-Sides was released on 19 November 2007 in the UK and on 20 November 2007 in the United States.

Track listing
All songs are written by Gorillaz.

Song origins
 "68 State", "Bill Murray", "Murdoc Is God" (only in Japan), and "Spitting out the Demons" are B-sides of "Feel Good Inc.".
 "People", "Highway (Under Construction)", and "Dare" (Soulwax Remix) are B-sides of "Dare".
 "Hongkongaton" and "Murdoc Is God" are B-sides of "Dirty Harry".
 "We Are Happy Landfill" was made available as an additional downloadable track on the limited edition of Demon Days.
 "Hong Kong" was originally released as part of Help: A Day in the Life compilation, but re-recorded for D-Sides.
 "Rockit", "Dare" (DFA Remix), "Feel Good Inc." (Stanton Warriors Remix), "Kids with Guns" (Jamie T's Turns to Monsters Mix), "Kids with Guns" (Hot Chip Remix), "El Mañana" (Metronomy Remix), "Dare" (Junior Sanchez Remix), "Dirty Harry" (Schtung Chinese New Year Remix), and "Kids with Guns" (Quiet Village Remix) were made available for promotion of Demon Days.
 "The Swagga" is found on the limited edition Demon Days DVD.
 "Don't Get Lost in Heaven" (Original Demo Version) and "Stop the Dams" are B-sides of "El Mañana" / "Kids with Guns".

Charts

Weekly charts

Year-end charts

References

External links

Albums produced by Damon Albarn
Albums produced by Danger Mouse (musician)
Albums recorded at Studio 13
Gorillaz albums
B-side compilation albums
2007 remix albums
2007 compilation albums
EMI Records remix albums
EMI Records compilation albums
Parlophone remix albums
Parlophone compilation albums
Virgin Records remix albums
Virgin Records compilation albums